Begayt is an Ethiopian breed of cattle. Currently there are ongoing cross-breeding programmes with Arado cattle, in an attempt to increase the milk production of the latter.

Origin of the cattle breed 
Ethiopia has been at a crossroads for cattle immigration to Africa due to
 proximity to the geographical entry of Indian and Arabian zebu
 proximity to Near-Eastern and European taurine
 introgression with West African taurine due to pastoralism
Furthermore, the diverse agro-ecology led to diverse farming systems which, in turn, made Ethiopia a centre of secondary diversification for livestock : 
 The Sanga cattle originated in Ethiopia. They are a major bovine group in Africa – a cross-breeding of local long-horned taurines and Arabian zebus
 The Begayt are one of the Zenga (Zebu-Sanga) breeds, which resulted from a second introduction and crossing with Indian zebu

Threats on the cattle breed 
 socio-political stresses: civil wars and recent urbanisation
 panzootic stresses: cattle plague
 environmental stresses drought and destruction of ecosystems
 extensive cross-breeding with Arado

Closely related types
 Arado cattle

References 

Cattle breeds
Tigray Region
Cattle breeds originating in Ethiopia